The All-Albanian Congress or Albanian National Congress  or Albanian Independence Congress was a held in Vlorë (then Ottoman Empire, today Republic of Albania) on November 28, 1912. Congress participants constituted the Assembly of Vlorë which established Albanian Provisional Government and elected Ismail Qemali as its president.

Background 

The success of the Albanian Revolt of 1912 sent a strong signal to the neighboring countries that the Ottoman Empire was weak. The Kingdom of Serbia opposed the plan for an Albanian Vilayet, preferring a partition of the European territory of the Ottoman Empire among the four Balkan allies. Balkan allies planned the partition of the European territory of the Ottoman Empire among them and in the meantime the conquered territory was agreed to have status of the Condominium.

The combined armies of the Balkan allies overcame the numerically inferior and strategically disadvantaged Ottoman armies, and achieved rapid success. As a result of their success, almost all remaining European territories of the Ottoman Empire were captured by Balkan allies, which destroyed the plans for Albanian autonomy and independence. About two weeks before the congress was held, Albanian leaders appealed to Franz Joseph, Emperor of Austria-Hungary, explaining the difficult situation in their country divided into four vilayets occupied by Balkan allies. Austria-Hungary and Italy strongly opposed the arrival of Serbian army on the Adriatic Sea because they perceived it as treat to their domination of the Adriatic and feared that Serbian Adriatic port could become a Russian base.

The sitting of the congress 

When Ismail Qemali came to Albania in third week of November 1912, he discussed the future of the Albanian people with present participants of the congress. Although there was consensus for complete independence, they were also for friendly relation with the Ottoman Empire. Therefore, they sent telegrams to the Ottoman Western army, Vardar army and to Ioannina fortress pledging continued support for the war against the Christian states.

On November 28, 1912, the congress' first sitting was held in the house of Xhemil bey in Vlorë. Qemali invited Albanians from all four vilayets (Kosovo, Scutari, Monastir and Janina) within projected Albanian Vilayet to attend the congress. At the beginning of the session, Ismail Qemali took the floor and, referring to the threats to the rights Albanians had gained through successful revolts since 1908, proclaimed to the delegates that they should do anything necessary to save Albania.

Present participants of the congress 
After Qemali's speech they began by reviewing delegates' credentials.  The delegates were as follows:
Berat: Ilias Vrioni, Hajredin Çakrani, Xhelal Koprëncka, Babë Dud Karbunara, Taq Tutulani, Sami Vrioni (still awaited);
Dibër: Vehbi Dibra, Sherif Langu;
Durrës: Abaz Çelkupa, Mustafa Hanxhiu, Jahja Ballhysa, Nikoll Kaçorri;
Elbasan: Lef Nosi, Shefqet Dajiu, Qemal Karaosmani, Dervish Biçaku; Mid'hat Frashëri;
Gjirokastër (by telegram): Elmas Boçe, Veli Harçi, Azis Efendi Gjirokastra
Pejë (Gjakovë, Plavë and Guci): Rexhep Mitrovica, Bedri Pejani and Salih Gjuka
Krujë: Abdi Toptani, Mustafa Merlika-Kruja
Lushnjë: Qemal Mullai, Ferid Vokopola, Nebi Sefa;
Ohër and Strugë: Zyhdi Ohri, Dr. H. Myrtezai and Nuri Sojliu
Shijak: Xhelal Deliallisi, Ymer Deliallisi, Ibrahim Efendiu;
Tirana: Abdi Toptani, Murad Toptani;
Vlorë: Ismail Qemali, Zihni Abaz Kanina, Aristidh Ruci, Qazim Kokoshi, Jani Minga, Eqrem Vlora;
Albanian colony of Bucharest: Dhimitër Zografi, Dhimitër Mborja, Dhimitër Berati and Dhimitër Ilo

Missing participants of the congress 

Albanians from several provinces had not yet reached Vlora when it was decided to start the first session of the congress. Ismail Qemali refused to wait for Isa Boletini and other Albanians from Kosovo Vilayet and hastily made the Albanian declaration of independence. The southern elite wanted to prevent Boletini's plans to assert himself as a key political figure and used him to suit their military needs.

Since Korça, Shkodra, Përmet, Ohrid and Struga were surrounded by the armies that prevented some Albanians from those provinces to come to Vlorë, another Albanians from those towns were recognised as representatives of those towns. Their names are:

Korça: Pandeli Cale, Thanas Floqi, Spiro Ilo,
Shkodra: Luigj Gurakuqi
Përmet: Veli bej Këlcyra, Mid’hat bey Frashëri;
Ohrid and Struga: Hamdi bej Ohri and Mustafa Baruti

Rest of the missing participants of the congress that were late to attend its session and were not replaced by other Albanians are:
Çamëria: Veli Gërra, Jakup Veseli, Rexhep Demi, Azis Tahir Ajdonati;
Delvina: Avni bej Delvina;
Gramsh-Tomorricë: Ismail Qemali Gramshi (not to be confused with Ismail bej Qemal Vlora);
Janina: Kristo Meksi, Aristidh Ruci;
Kosova, Gjakova, Plav-Gusinje: Mehmet Pashë Derralla, Isa Boletini, Riza bej Gjakova, Hajdin bej Draga, Dervish bej Ipeku, Zenel bej Begolli, Qerim Begolli;
Peqin: Mahmud Efendi Kaziu;
Pogradeci: Hajdar Blloshmi;
Skrapar: Xhelal bej Koprencka; Hajredin bej Cakrani;
Tepelene: Feim bej Mezhgorani;

Constitution of the Assembly of Vlorë 

After the documents were checked, Ismail Qemali again took the floor and held a speech stating that he believes that the only way to prevent division of the territory of Albanian Vilayet between the Balkan allies is to separate it from Ottoman Empire. Qemali's proposal was unanimously accepted and it was decided to constitute the Assembly of Vlorë and to sign the declaration of independence of Albania. By signing the declaration of Albanian independence the present deputies of the Assembly of Vlorë rejected the autonomy granted by the Ottoman Empire to the Albanian Vilayet, projected a couple of months earlier. The consensus was made for the complete independence.

The sitting was then suspended and members of newly constituted National Assembly went to the house of Ismail Qemali and raised the flag of Skanderbeg on the balcony of his house, in front of the gathered people.

Aftermath 

The members of the newly constituted National Assembly returned from the balcony of Qemali's house and started the sitting of Assembly. They established the Provisional Government of Albania with Ismail Qemali as President who has the mandate to establish the Cabinet on the session of the Assembly of Vlorë held on December 4, 1912.

See also 

 Albanian Revolt of 1912
 Albanian Vilayet
 First Balkan War
 Assembly of Vlorë

References

External links 
 

Modern history of Albania
Albanian Declaration of Independence
1912 in Albania
1912 conferences
 1912